Tyler Chase Dollander (born October 26, 2001) is an American college baseball pitcher for the Tennessee Volunteers. He previously played college baseball for the Georgia Southern Eagles.

Early life
Tyler Chase Dollander was born on October 26, 2001, in Evans, Georgia. He attended Greenbrier High School in Evans where he played baseball. In 2018, his sophomore season, he went 5–3 with a 2.36 ERA. As a junior in 2019, he went 6–1 with a 0.79 ERA and 71 strikeouts over  innings. He went unselected in the 2020 Major League Baseball draft, and enrolled at Georgia Southern University to play college baseball.

College career
As a freshman at Georgia Southern in 2021, Dollander made 11 starts in which he went 4–3 with a 4.04 ERA and 64 strikeouts over 49 innings. After the season, he transferred to the University of Tennessee. He spent the 2021 season in their starting rotation, although he missed three weeks during the season after being hit by a line drive. Over 16 games (14 starts) for the season, he went 10–0 with a 2.39 ERA and 108 strikeouts over 79 innings. He was named the Southeastern Conference Baseball Pitcher of the Year. Dollander entered the 2023 season as a top prospect for upcoming MLB draft.

Personal life
Dollander's brother, Hunter, was a pitcher at Georgia Gwinnett College.

References

External links
Tennessee Volunteers bio

2001 births
Living people
People from Evans, Georgia
Baseball players from Georgia (U.S. state)
Baseball pitchers
Tennessee Volunteers baseball players
All-American college baseball players
Georgia Southern Eagles baseball players